Mary Ann Severne (b. Auckland, New Zealand) is a New Zealand-born Australian actress active in Australian made films and television programs from the 1970s.

Career 
She began her acting career in various theatre productions including playing Paola in a production of There's a Girl in My Soup, and she was part of a company at the Wayside Chapel, Sydney. Late 1960s Australian television appearances include The Mavis Bramston Show, and Contrabandits.

She made many television appearances throughout the 1970s, appearing several times in guest roles in the Crawford Productions police dramas Homicide, Division 4 and Matlock Police. She also worked in the UK, starring in the comedy feature film shot there The Adventures of Barry McKenzie (1972), and making appearances in the TV anthology series Thriller in 1973, Moonbase 3 in 1973, and Father Brown in 1974. Returning to Australia she played a leading regular role in soap opera Number 96 from 1975 until 1977, and played a guest role in situation comedy series Doctor Down Under in 1979. Roles in the 1980s include an appearance in feature film Run Rebecca, Run! (1981), four episodes of A Country Practice in 1982 and 1984, and a role in TV movie Barracuda (1988). She is married to actor Henri Szeps.

Filmography

External links

Notes

Australian television actresses
Australian people of New Zealand descent
Living people
Year of birth missing (living people)
20th-century Australian actresses
21st-century Australian women
21st-century Australian people